The 15657 / 15658 Brahmaputra Mail is a daily train that connects Old Delhi with Kamakhya (an important town in Assam). Introduced in 1972 after the construction of the rail section of the Farakka Barrage, the train originally ran as the Tinsukia Mail between Delhi Junction railway station and New Bongaigaon railway stations, with onward metre-gauge connection by a train of the same name numbered as 7Up and 8Dn to Guwahati and Tinsukia in the Indian state of Assam. The train was renamed the Brahmaputra Mail after the successful gauge conversion of the New Bongaigaon–Dibrugarh metre-gauge lines to broad gauge.

Services
Originally ran as 155 dn by 156 up it was originally started by Northeast Frontier Railway which is called NFR in short. Later on, the primary maintenance was transferred to the Delhi Division of the Northern Railway and ran under the numbers 14056up by 14055 dn. The train recently got LHB rake and the primary maintenance went back to NFR with Dibrugarh being the maintenance station. Once the pride of NFR with neon lights in its first class compartments and has eight cushioned sleeper class coaches in the 1970s, the train went to a sharp decline both in priority and facilities with conditioning of its rake worsening. However, with the new LHB rake trying to get its lost glory back. The up train belongs to Northeast Frontier Railway zone. Northeast Frontier Railways decided it will be running as 15955/15956 Brahmaputra Mail from 9 December 2019.

Schedule
In return the train will run between Old Delhi & Kamakhya Junction, covering  in 38 hrs 00 mins on the 3rd day as 15956' (e.g.: the train departing DLI at 23:40 hrs on Thursday would reach KYQ on Saturday afternoon at 13.40 hrs) with an average moving speed of

Coach composition
The train has both AC and non-AC class of accommodation. The composition of this train is 

1st General coach runs as locked (for RMS use).

Locomotive

After the completion of electrification, from 22/10/2021, this train is running end to end from Old Delhi to Kamakhya hauled by a Ghaziabad-based WAP-5 / WAP-7 locomotive.

Route & Halts

The train runs from 
Kamakhya via 

Falakata Railway Station
Dhupguri railway station
New Jalpaiguri (Siliguri)

 
New Farakka Junction

 

 to 
Delhi Junction railway station.

Trivia
 This is one of the oldest-running trains of this zone. This train is known for its amount of defense personnel using this train.
 This train was also involved in two major railway disasters in Indian history. One was the bombing of the train between Kokrajhar and New Bongaigaon in December 1996 by Bodo Militants, and second was the Gaisal Rail Disaster, a head-on collision between Avadh Assam Express and Brahmaputra Mail.

References

Transport in Dibrugarh
Transport in Delhi
Railway services introduced in 1974
Named passenger trains of India
Rail transport in Assam
Rail transport in Uttar Pradesh
Rail transport in Nagaland
Rail transport in West Bengal
Rail transport in Jharkhand
Rail transport in Delhi
Rail transport in Bihar
Mail trains in India
Express trains in India